Strong is the tenth studio album by German singer Thomas Anders. It was first released by CD Land on 11 February 2010 in Russia.

Track listing
All tracks written by Sergey Revtov and produced by Vladimir Nichiporuk.

Charts

Weekly charts

Year-end charts

Certifications

Release history

References

2010 albums
Thomas Anders albums